Fort Severn First Nation ( [] in Cree) is a Western Swampy Cree First Nation band government located on the Severn River near Hudson Bay. It is the most northern community in Ontario, Canada. In 2001, the population was 401, consisting of 90 families in an area of 40 square kilometres. The legal name of the reserve is Fort Severn 89, with the main settlement of Fort Severn ( []).

The town is linked by a winter/ice road called the Wapusk Trail during the winter to Peawanuck, Ontario, in the east, and Shamattawa and Gillam, Manitoba, to the west.

Fort Severn is policed by the Nishnawbe-Aski Police Service, an Indigenous-based service.

History 
This area was inhabited for thousands of years by varying cultures of indigenous peoples.  At the time of European contact, the historic Swampy Cree, an Algonquian-speaking people, lived in the area.

In 1689 the Hudson's Bay Company built Fort Severn at this site, originally naming it Fort James; it was one of the earliest English fur trading posts in the New World. After years of international competition between the English and French, with their wars playing out in North America, the French attacked the outpost and pillaged it in 1782 when they were allies of the Thirteen Colonies during the American Revolutionary War.

In the early 20th century, when the federal government negotiated a treaty with the First Nations, it set aside land for a native reserve in the Rocksand area at the confluence of the Severn and Sachigo Rivers, with the consent of the leaders at the time. In 1973, the reserve was relocated to the mouth of the Severn River on Hudson Bay, for more direct access to shipping.  The reserve achieved full status on January 11, 1980.

Government

The local band council consists of an elected chief, a deputy chief, and four band councillors.

Community services

There is no hospital in Fort Severn, with medical needs provided either at the local nursing station or via Keewaytinook Okimakanak Telemedicine (KOTM) link. The Community Doctor (Christopher Arthur Giles) travels in every month to do regular check-ups, follow-ups, and schedule appointments and surgeries. Specialists such as optometrists, dentists, and hygienists travel to Fort Severn every two to three months.

Transportation

There are only local roads in town and residents travel by car, snowmobile, four-wheelers, or walking.

The Fort Severn Airport is located a short distance from the settlement and is reached by an access road.

Education

Wasaho Cree Nation School is the full functioning school providing primary education needs. It was built in 2016, preparing students for 21st century learning.  Keewaytinook Internet High School is housed in a small building and provides distance learning for residents needing secondary education.

Climate
Fort Severn has a subarctic climate (Dfc) and is one of the coldest communities in Ontario. Summers typically have cool to mild weather with short heatwaves, while winters are severely cold and long, lasting from October to sometimes through May.

In popular culture
Fort James, a British settlement controlled by a governor who reports to the king and who represents Hudson Bay Company, is the principal setting of the 2016 TV series, Frontier. As Ann Foster describes for ScreenerTV, "'Frontier' is set in the coastal settlement of Fort James: A snowy, treacherous pocket of land that would, in a century’s time, become part of Canada."

A town by the name of Fort Severn is featured in several episodes of the 1996 anime series After War Gundam X.

References

Stats Canada 
 Question and Answer

External links
Fort Severn First Nation

Populated places on Hudson Bay
Cree reserves in Ontario
Communities in Kenora District
Nishnawbe Aski Nation
Hudson's Bay Company forts
Road-inaccessible communities of Ontario
Swampy Cree